The 1950–51 Nationalliga A season was the 13th season of the Nationalliga A, the top level of ice hockey in Switzerland. Eight teams participated in the league, and EHC Arosa won the championship.

First round

Group 1

Group 2

Final round

5th-8th place

Relegation 
 Young Sprinters Neuchâtel - HC La Chaux-de-Fonds 8:7

External links
 Championnat de Suisse 1950/51

Swiss
National League (ice hockey) seasons
1950–51 in Swiss ice hockey